Josoa Razafimahatratra (born 7 February 1980) is a retired Malagasy football midfielder.

References

1980 births
Living people
Malagasy footballers
Madagascar international footballers
Léopards de Transfoot players
Association football midfielders